Armando Tallarigo, Baron of Zagarise and Sersale (Catanzaro, 14 August 1864 - Rome, 22 April 1952) was an Italian soldier and politician.

Biography 
The eldest son of Baron Francesco, mayor of Sersale, and Barbara Greco, he belonged to a noble and wealthy family from the small town in the Presila district of Catanzaro. His paternal ancestors included the archpriest Francesco Maria, who had courageously saved Sersale from destruction during the Napoleonic period, while on his mother's side Antonio Greco had been one of the first and most active Calabrian opponents of the Bourbon regime. The family's clear Risorgimento faith was later reflected in the names of Armando Tallarigo's brother and sister, Garibaldi and Italia.

After probably following his primary studies with monks of the Benedictine Order, he was admitted to the Military College of the Nunziatella in Naples in 1878, where he met his later brotherly friend Alfredo Taranto and graduated first in his course. Admitted to the Artillery academy in 1882, he was second lieutenant in the General Staff two years later and took part in the Libyan campaign, from which he returned with a bronze medal for military valour earned in the Battle of Zanzur. He then took part in the First World War in command of the 152nd Infantry Battalion (Sassari Brigade), where he distinguished himself in the advance at Castel Gomberto and earned a silver medal for being wounded at Casara Zebio. In 1917, promoted to brigadier general, he led the Sassari on the Bainsizza plateau to conquer 865 and 862 peaks. After the war he held command of the military division in Bari and the War School in Turin. Retired in 1930, he was appointed senator for life in 1934 and was removed from office by a sentence of the High Court of Justice for Sanctions against Fascism on 5 December 1944.

Bibliography

References

Links 

 Emilio Lussu
 Giuseppe Musinu
 Un anno sull'Altipiano
 Uomini contro

Medals

Civilian

Military

References

Recipients of the Bronze Medal of Military Valor
Recipients of the Silver Medal of Military Valor
Grand Officers of the Order of Saints Maurice and Lazarus
Commanders of the Order of Saints Maurice and Lazarus
Officers of the Order of Saints Maurice and Lazarus
Knights of the Order of Saints Maurice and Lazarus
Italian generals
1864 births
1952 deaths
People from Catanzaro